is a passenger railway station located in the city of  Isehara, Kanagawa Prefecture, Japan.  The station operated by the private railway operator Odakyu Electric Railway.

Lines
Isehara Station is served by the Odakyu Odawara Line, and lies 52.2 rail kilometers from the line's terminal at Shinjuku Station.

Station layout
The station has two island platforms with four tracks, connected to the station building by a footbridge.

Platforms

History
Isehara Station was opened on 1 April 1927, on the Odakyu Odawara Line of the Odakyu Electric Railway with normal and 6-car limited express services. A new station building was completed in 1967. This was replaced in 2008 by the current station building, with includes a large department store and supermarket operated by the Odakyu Company.

Station numbering was introduced in January 2014 with Isehara being assigned station number OH36.

Passenger statistics
In fiscal 2019, the station was used by an average of 51,705 passengers daily.

The passenger figures for previous years are as shown below.

Surrounding area
 Isehara Elementary School
 Isehara Sakuradai Post Office
 Isehara Junior High School

See also
List of railway stations in Japan

References

External links

Official home page.

Railway stations in Japan opened in 1927
Odakyu Odawara Line
Railway stations in Kanagawa Prefecture
Isehara, Kanagawa